The US 67 Bridge over Little Missouri River is a historic bridge carrying U.S. Route 67 (US 67) over the Little Missouri River, the border between Clark County and Nevada County, Arkansas. Built in 1931, it is one of only seven surviving multi-span Parker truss bridges in the state.

The bridge was listed on the National Register of Historic Places in 2007.

See also
 
 
 
 
 List of bridges on the National Register of Historic Places in Arkansas
 National Register of Historic Places listings in Clark County, Arkansas
 National Register of Historic Places listings in Nevada County, Arkansas

References

Road bridges on the National Register of Historic Places in Arkansas
Bridges completed in 1931
Transportation in Clark County, Arkansas
National Register of Historic Places in Nevada County, Arkansas
U.S. Route 67
National Register of Historic Places in Clark County, Arkansas
Steel bridges in the United States
Parker truss bridges in the United States
Bridges of the United States Numbered Highway System
1931 establishments in Arkansas
Transportation in Nevada County, Arkansas
Little Missouri River (Arkansas)